Diogeneia (Ancient Greek: Διογένεια) may refer to three women in Greek mythology:

 Diogeneia, daughter of the river god Cephissus and the wife of Phrasimus by whom she became the mother of Praxithea, wife of King Erechtheus.
Diogeneia, an Eleusinian princess as one of the daughters of King Celeus and Metanira.
Diogeneia, daughter of Phorbas, from Olenus in Achaea, and possibly Hyrmina, thus sister to Augeas, Actor and Tiphys. She was the wife of King Alector of Elis and mother of Amarynceus. Otherwise, the latter was called the son of Onesimachus

Notes

References 

 Apollodorus, The Library with an English Translation by Sir James George Frazer, F.B.A., F.R.S. in 2 Volumes, Cambridge, MA, Harvard University Press; London, William Heinemann Ltd. 1921. . Online version at the Perseus Digital Library. Greek text available from the same website.
Gaius Julius Hyginus, Fabulae from The Myths of Hyginus translated and edited by Mary Grant. University of Kansas Publications in Humanistic Studies. Online version at the Topos Text Project.
Pausanias, Description of Greece with an English Translation by W.H.S. Jones, Litt.D., and H.A. Ormerod, M.A., in 4 Volumes. Cambridge, MA, Harvard University Press; London, William Heinemann Ltd. 1918. . Online version at the Perseus Digital Library
Pausanias, Graeciae Descriptio. 3 vols. Leipzig, Teubner. 1903.  Greek text available at the Perseus Digital Library.

Princesses in Greek mythology
Achaean characters in Greek mythology
Attican characters in Greek mythology
Elean mythology